SS Blackburn was a passenger and cargo vessel built for the Great Central Railway in 1910.

History

The ship was built by Earle's Shipbuilding of Hull and launched on 8 September 1910 by Miss Joyce Evelyn Barwick of Grimsby. She was built with accommodation for 100 first-class, 10 second-class and 300 third-class passengers.

She had a very short career with the Great Central Railway as on 8 December 1910 she was in collision with the London steamer Rook off Sheringham, Norfolk. Twenty-eight crew and twenty-nine passengers escaped in three lifeboats. The wreck was located five days later and found to be lying in three fathoms of water. It was marked with a buoy.

References

1910 ships
Steamships of the United Kingdom
Ships built on the Humber
Ships of the Great Central Railway